Seven Days' Leave is a 1942 musical comedy about a soldier (Victor Mature) who has seven days to marry an heiress (Lucille Ball) in order to inherit $100,000.

Plot
Army privates Johnny Grey, Speak Jackson and Buddy "Clarky" Clark were members of the Les Brown band before they joined the army. When they are granted seven days' leave before shipping out, they attend an old Les Brown concert, where Johnny renews his romance with band performer Mapy Cortés.

Johnny then discovers that he is heir to his great-grandfather's $100,000 fortune. Overwhelmed with excitement, Johnny promises to buy Mapy a diamond engagement ring. Johnny goes to New York to claim his inheritance, accompanied by Clarky, Jackson, and their friend Bitsy. Throckmorton P. Gildersleeve, the representative of the estate, tells Johnny that he must marry a descendant of the Havelock-Allen family in order to collect his inheritance.

Johnny is reluctant to do so until he meets Terry Havelock-Allen, the wealthy and glamorous elder daughter of the family. However Terry is engaged to financial advisor Ralph Bell.

Johnny pursues Terry. He has Jackson, an amateur impressionist, lure Ralph out of town by impersonating Ronald Colman and Lionel Barrymore on the telephone requesting his financial advice. Johnny takes Terry on a date to a radio broadcast of Truth or Consequences, and the next day takes her on a picnic. Terry and Johnny kiss but she then orders her butler to throw Johnny out of the house. Terry's younger sister Mickey thinks Terry should marry Johnny and not Ralph.

Mapy breaks off her relationship with Johnny, realising he is in love with someone else. Mickey tells Johnny that Terry is in love with him.

Terry is contemplating eloping with Ralph when Johnny arrives and they kiss. The two decide to get married. But before Johnny has the chance to tell Terry about the terms of his great-grandfather's will, Gildersleeve blurts out the details of their business arrangement, causing Terry to break it off with Johnny.

Ralph discovers that Jackson has been impersonating film stars. Ralph slugs Jackson and Johnny, a fight ensues and the military police arrive and arrest Jackson, Bitsy, Clark and Johnny.

The next day, the four soldiers watch from their jail cell as their company ships out to Japan. However Mapy explains the situation to Terry, who then forgives Johnny.

Johnny and Terry get married, the four privates rejoin their company aboard ship and say goodbye to their women.

Cast
 Victor Mature as Johnny Grey
 Lucille Ball as Terry Havelock-Allen
 Harold Peary as Throckmorton P. Gildersleeve aka The Great Gildersleeve
 Mapy Cortés as Mapy Cortés
 Ginny Simms as herself
 Les Brown as himself
 Freddy Martin as himself
 Marcy McGuire as Mickey Havelock-Allen
 Arnold Stang as Bitsy
 Buddy Clark as himself
 Lynn, Royce and Vanya
 Ralph Edwards
 Peter Lind Hayes as Speak Jackson

Production
The film was the idea of RKO executives. It was originally known as Sweet or Hot. Filming took place in June 1942. According to Hedda Hopper, Victor Mature, Lucille Ball and Tim Whelan had a massive fight on set which held up filming for an hour.

The film features the casts of several popular NBC Golden Age of Radio shows of the time. Tim Whelan discovered Marcy McGuire singing in a nightclub in Chicago. He arranged for a screen test and cast her in the film.

Songs
Music by Jimmy McHugh

Lyrics by Frank Loesser

 Please Won't You Leave My Girl Alone
 Can't Get Out of This Mood (Ginny Simms and Freddy Martin Orchestra)
 You Speak My Language (Mapy Cortés, Sergio Orta, Victor Mature and Les Brown and His Band of Renown)
 A Touch of Texas (Marcy McGuire, Peter Lind Hayes, Harold Peary, Victor Mature and Freddy Martin Orchestra)
 Soft Hearted (Freddy Martin Orchestra)
 I Get the Neck of the Chicken (Marcy McGuire)
 Puerto Rico

Reception

Box office
The film was a hit at the box office and earned RKO a profit of $673,000.

Sequel
Seven Days' Leave led to a follow up film about the navy, Seven Days Ashore (1944).

References

External links 
 
 
 
 

1942 films
RKO Pictures films
Military humor in film
American black-and-white films
1942 musical comedy films
American musical comedy films
1940s English-language films
Films directed by Tim Whelan
1940s American films
The Great Gildersleeve
Films about inheritances